Blue Green Orange is the third album by the Canadian rock band I Mother Earth, released by Universal on July 13, 1999. It was the band's first album with new lead singer Brian Byrne. The album featured covers in blue, green, or orange. The album was certified gold in Canada.

The album, while still in the vein of the prior jam-oriented albums, was mellower and offered several twists. These included tribal rhythms, computerized loops and instrumental elements similar to modern indie rock.

Track listing 
(All songs written by "I Mother Earth", later revealed to be Jagori and Christian Tanna, except "My Beautiful Deep End", by Jagori Tanna and Brian Byrne)

Personnel 
 Brian Byrne – vocals
 Jagori Tanna – guitars, backing vocals
 Bruce Gordon – bass
 Christian Tanna – drums

Additional musicians 
 Geddy Lee – bass on "Good for Sule"
 Daniel Mansilla – percussion
 Armando Borg – percussion

References 

1999 albums
I Mother Earth albums
Albums recorded at Le Studio